Prahaladapuram is a suburban area in Visakhapatnam city under Greater Visakhapatnam Municipal Corporation of Pendurthi in Andhra Pradesh, India. It is located 14 km Nomet from Visakhapatnam city center.

Vepagunta is the head post office and postal pin code is 530047.

How to reach 
By road: It is well connected with number of city buses plying from RK Beach, Gajuwaka, NAD X Road, Dwaraka bus station in Visakhapatnam city. Also number of buses available from Vijayanagaram

Andhra Pradesh State Road Transport Corporation routes:

By rail: Pendurthi, Simhachalam North railway stations are very closely located. Marripalem railway station and Visakhapatnam railway stations are within 15 km range.

Educational institutions 
Many schools and colleges are located in and around Prahaladapuram. T S R N Jr. College, Pendurthi, St. Xavier's Degree college, ZPHS, Vepgunta are prominent.

References

Neighbourhoods in Visakhapatnam